Nicolau is a surname that occurs in multiple cultures and languages, including Portuguese, Romanian, Catalan, and Greek, and which is derived from the given name Nicolau, a variant of Nicholas, or is a variant spelling of Nicolaou. The name may refer to:

Alexandru Nicolau (1889–1937), Romanian political activist
Antoni Nicolau (1858–1933), Spanish composer
Christian Nicolau (born 1947), French athlete
Cristina Nicolau (born 1977), Romanian athlete
Dimitri Nicolau (1946–2008), Italian musician of Greek origin
Enric Mas Nicolau (born 1995), Spanish cyclist
George Nicolau (1925–2020), American arbitrator of Greek origin
Ivo Nicolau (born 1983), Portuguese footballer
Jackson Nicolau (born 1987), Australian footballer of Greek origin
Melisa Nicolau (born 1984), Spanish footballer
Nick Nicolau (1933–2014), American football coach
Nicky Nicolau (born 1983), English footballer of Greek Cypriot origin
Serghei Nicolau (1905–1999), Romanian espionage chief
Ștefan Gh. Nicolau (1874–1970), Romanian physician, dermato-venerologist
Ștefan S. Nicolau (1896–1967), Romanian physician, inframicrobiologist

See also

Nicola (name)
Nicolae (name)
Nicolaj
Nicolay

References

Portuguese-language surnames
Romanian-language surnames
Greek-language surnames
Surnames from given names